Poole Silver Company was an American silver manufacturing company, active in Taunton, Massachusetts from 1892-1971.

The Poole Silver Company was formed in 1892 by George Poole and Edward Roche in Taunton as Poole, Roche & Co., then established as a corporation on May 21, 1895, as an early manufacturer of silver products made with electroplating techniques. In 1900 it operated in a small two-room factory at 106 Whittenton Street, and later moved to 320 Whittenton Street. From 1946 the firm began to produce sterling silver flatware, holloware, and cutlery. In 1971 the company was bought by Towle Silversmiths. The intellectual property currently belongs to Lifetime Brands.

References 
 "Poole Silver Company", Online Encyclopedia of Silver Marks, Hallmarks & Makers' Marks]
 "Poole Silver Co", American Silver Plate Marks.
 Tercentenary of Taunton, Massachusetts, 1639 [to] 1939, June 4–10, Taunton Tercentenary Committee, 1939, page 53.
 Abstracts of the Certificates of Corporations Organized ..., Massachusetts, Secretary of the Commonwealth, 1895, page 192.
 The Taunton Directory, Bordon and Tew, 1900, page 355.
 American Silver Manufacturers, Dorothy T. Rainwater, Everybodys Press, 1966, page 134.

American silversmiths